Korsør railway station ( or previously Korsør Banegård) is a railway station serving the town of Korsør in southwestern Zealand, Denmark.

Korsør station is located on the main line Copenhagen–Fredericia railway from Copenhagen to Funen and Jutland. The station opened in 1856 as the western terminus of the Vestbanen railway line from Copenhagen to Korsør. The original station was located by the harbour from where there was connection via railway ferry across the Great Belt to Nyborg on the island of Funen. Korsør station was moved to its current location in 1997 with the openingen of the railway section of the Great Belt Bridge.

The station offers direct InterCity services to Copenhagen, Funen and Jutland, regional rail services to Copenhagen and Odense operated by the national railway company DSB.

Architecture 

Korsør station's second and still-existing station building was built in 1907 to designs by the Danish architect Heinrich Wenck (1851–1936), known for the numerous railway stations he designed across Denmark in his capacity of head architect of the Danish State Railways. The station building was listed in 1992.

See also
 List of railway stations in Denmark

References

Citations

Bibliography

External links

 Banedanmark – government agency responsible for maintenance and traffic control of most of the Danish railway network
 DSB – the Danish national train operating company
 Lokaltog – Danish regional railway company operating in the Capital Region and Region Zealand
 Danske Jernbaner – website with information on railway history in Denmark

Korsør
Railway stations in Region Zealand
Railway stations opened in 1856
1856 establishments in Denmark
Railway stations opened in 1907
1907 establishments in Denmark
Railway stations opened in 1997
1997 establishments in Denmark
Heinrich Wenck railway stations
Buildings and structures in Slagelse Municipality
Listed buildings and structures in Slagelse Municipality
Railway stations in Denmark opened in the 19th century